Nells Island is the larger of two islands in the Charles E. Wheeler Wildlife Management Area at the mouth of the Housatonic River. It is directly across the river from the American Shakespeare Theatre in Stratford, Connecticut. The island is uninhabited but is designated as a "miscellaneous open space" by the City of Milford.

The island is within the boundaries of the City of Milford, Connecticut and is owned and managed by State of Connecticut.

Transportation
All transportation to and from the island is by boat.

Internal Links
Charles E. Wheeler Wildlife Management Area

Notes

Milford, Connecticut
River islands of Connecticut
Landforms of New Haven County, Connecticut
Uninhabited islands of the United States